Voyampolsky is a volcano located in the northern part of the Kamchatka Peninsula, Russia. It is composed of two shield volcanoes, Voyampolsky and Kakhtana. Voyampolsky is the highest one. Headwaters of the Kakhtana River are located nearby.

See also
 List of volcanoes in Russia

References 
 

Mountains of the Kamchatka Peninsula
Volcanoes of the Kamchatka Peninsula
Shield volcanoes of Russia
Quaternary volcanoes
Quaternary Asia